Cai Shu Du or Shu Du of Cai (Chinese: , given name Du, was the first ruler of the State of Cai.

Du was the fifth son of King Wen of Zhou and his wife Taisi. He had ten brothers and eight half-brothers. His elder brothers were Kao (Boyi Kao), Fa (King Wu of Zhou), Xian (Guan Shu), and Dan (the Duke of Zhou).

He was given the fief of Cai by King Wu after the overthrow of the last Shang king, Zhou. Du's realm centered on present-day Shangcai, Henan. He and his brothers Guan Shu Xian and Huo Shu Chu (霍叔處) were known as the Three Guards, but when King Wu died and the Duke of Zhou assumed the regency for the young King Cheng, they rebelled along with Wu Geng. The Duke of Zhou was able to suppress the rebellion and Du was exiled, although Cheng eventually recreated the realm of Cai as a grant to Du's son Zhong Hu.

References 

11th-century BC Chinese monarchs
11th century BC in China
Zhou dynasty nobility
Cai (state)
Founding monarchs